Chang'e 5-T1 was an experimental robotic spacecraft that was launched to the Moon on 23 October 2014 by the China National Space Administration (CNSA) to conduct atmospheric re-entry tests on the capsule design planned to be used in the Chang'e 5 mission. As part of the Chinese Lunar Exploration Program, Chang'e 5, launched in 2020, was a Moon sample return mission. Like its predecessors, the spacecraft is named after the Chinese Moon goddess Chang'e. The craft consisted of a return vehicle capsule and a service module orbiter.

The return capsule of Chang'e 5-T1, named Xiaofei meaning "little flyer" in Chinese, landed in Siziwang Banner, Inner Mongolia on 31 October 2014, 22:42 UTC.  The CE-5-T1 Service Module entered lunar orbit on 13 January 2015. Its initial orbit was 200 x 5,300 km with period of 8 hours.

Characteristics

It consisted of a DFH-3A "Chang'e 2 type" spacecraft with a mass of approximately 2,215 kg (including 1,065 kg of fuel) carrying the Chang'e 5 return capsule with a mass of under 335 kg. The craft was launched by a Long March 3C rocket into a lunar free return trajectory. It looped behind the Moon and returned to Earth, with the return capsule testing the high speed atmospheric skip reentry.

The DFH-3A "service module" remained in orbit around the Earth before being relocated via Earth-Moon L2 to lunar Lissajous orbit by 13 January 2015, where it will use its remaining 800 kg of fuel to test maneuvers key to future lunar missions.

In February and March 2015 the DFH-3A "service module" performed two "virtual target" rendezvous tests for the future Chang'e 5 mission. In April 2015 the small monitoring camera was used to obtain higher resolution photos of Chang'e 5's landing zone.

Mission profile

Main Mission 
Launch: Xichang Satellite Launch Center, 23 October 2014, 18:00 UTC
Nominal mission duration: Chang'e 5 return capsule: 196 hours (8.17 days)
Nominal mission duration: DFH-3A: Ongoing
Lunar fly-by: 97 hours after final orbit insertion (4.04 days)
Periselenium: ≈13,000 km from Moon surface
Distance of Moon from Earth at closest fly-by: ≈373,000 km
Landing: Siziwang Banner, Inner Mongolia, 31 October 2014, 22:42 UTC

Lunar Orbiter 
In January 2015, the service module transitioned to lunar orbit, orbiting at 200x5300 km. It was still active in early 2018  and was last heard by amateurs radio-astronomers in late 2020.

Third stage disposal 

The Long March 3C third stage booster, left in orbit between the Earth and the Moon, was predicted to hit, and did hit, the Moon on March 4, 2022, impacting near the Hertzsprung crater. Independent spectral analysis from the University of Arizona confirmed its Chinese origin. NASA has published a note on the event. China's foreign ministry has denied this identification, stating that the booster had already burned up in the Earth's atmosphere.  The US Space Command confirmed the third stage never reentered in Earth's atmosphere, and a compatible item is now present on the Space-Track catalogue as object 85900. The impactor object was previously misidentified as 2015-007B, the second stage of the Falcon 9 rocket which launched NASA's Deep Space Climate Observatory (DSCOVR) spacecraft, but was later correctly identified as the Long March stage in February 2022. The event showed how hard it is to track small objects in deep space.

In June 2022, a compatible double crater was found by the LROC team at the same location previously estimated.

Secondary payloads

Chang'e 5-T1 also carries the first commercial payload to the Moon called the 4M mission (Manfred Memorial Moon Mission) for the German space technology company OHB System, in honor of the company's founder, Manfred Fuchs, who died in 2014. Technical management of the 4M mission was performed by LuxSpace. The payload weighs 14 kilograms and contains two scientific instruments. The first instrument is a radio beacon to test a new approach for locating spacecraft. Amateur radio operators were encouraged via prize incentives to receive the transmissions and send results back to LuxSpace. The second instrument, a radiation dosimeter provided by the Spanish company iC-Málaga, continuously measured radiation levels throughout the satellite's circumlunar path.

The spacecraft also carries a radiation exposure experiment with bacteria and plants.

See also

 Chinese space program
 Chinese Lunar Exploration Program (CLEP) 
 Exploration of the Moon
 List of missions to the Moon
 Robotic exploration of the Moon

References

External links
 Manfred Memorial Moon Mission (4M) – Official website for secondary payload at Chang'e 5-T1
 Pocket Spacecraft – Space exploration for everyone   – Official website for another secondary payload at Chang'e 5-T1 

2014 in China
Chinese Lunar Exploration Program
Chinese space probes
Missions to the Moon
Space probes launched in 2014
Spacecraft launched by Long March rockets